Senator St. John may refer to:

Daniel B. St. John (1808–1890), New York State Senate
John St. John (American politician) (1833–1916), Kansas State Senate